Timber Lake(s) may refer to:

Populated places
 Timber Lake, South Dakota
 Timber Lakes, Utah

Lakes
 Timber Lake in Desha County, Arkansas
 Timber Lake in Fulton County, Arkansas
 Timber Lake in Saline County, Arkansas
 Timber Lake (Jackson County, Minnesota)

See also 
 Timberlake (disambiguation)
 List of lakes named Timber Lake